Paegam Ch'ŏngnyŏn station is a railway station in Paegam-ŭp, Paegam county, Ryanggang province, North Korea, on the Paektusan Ch'ŏngnyŏn Line of the Korean State Railway. The narrow-gauge Paengmu Line connects to the standard-gauge network here.

History
Originally called Paegam station (Chosŏn'gŭl: 백암역; Hanja: 白岩駅), the station, along with the rest of the Hapsu–Paegam section, was opened by the Government Railways of Chosen (朝鮮総督府鉄道) on 1 August 1934. It received its current name in 1960.

On 9 October 2006 an underground nuclear test was conducted at P'unggye-ri in Kilju County, causing the closure of the line for 3–4 months.

Services
Paegam station is an important hub for freight traffic in Ryanggang province. Raw logs are shipped here from locations on the Paengmu line, and forwarded by rail to a large sawmill at Wiyŏn, as well as to a pulp mill and plywood factory in Kilju.

Express passenger trains 1/2, operating between P'yŏngyang and Hyesan Ch'ŏngnyŏn, stop at Paegam station.

References

Railway stations in North Korea
Railway stations opened in 1934
1934 establishments in Korea